Peter Michael Roebuck (6 March 195612 November 2011) was an English cricketer who later became an Australian newspaper columnist and radio commentator.

A consistent county performer with over 25,000 runs, and "one of the better English openers of the 1980s", Roebuck captained the English county side Somerset between 1986 and 1988. During 1989, Roebuck also captained an England XI one-day cricket team in two matches. His post-playing career as an erudite writer earned him great acclaim as a journalist with the Sunday Times and later as an author. 

Roebuck committed suicide in Cape Town, South Africa, on 12 November 2011 after being asked by police to answer questions about an allegation of sexual assault. A book by Tim Lane and Elliot Cartledge titled Chasing Shadows – The Life and Death of Peter Roebuck was published in October 2015.

Early life
Roebuck was born in the village of Oddington, outside Oxford, on 6 March 1956, the son of two schoolteachers and one of six children; he attended Millfield School where his mother was a mathematics teacher and his father an economics teacher. The headmaster, Jack Meyer, a former Somerset County Cricket Club Captain, had offered his parents employment at the school so that they could afford the fees. Meyer was an unconventional headmaster who wanted to encourage cricket talent. On entering Meyer's office for the interview for admission, Roebuck found an orange flying through the air towards him; he caught it, and in his book It Never Rains speculated whether he would have got into Millfield if he had dropped it. He later studied law at Emmanuel College at the University of Cambridge, graduating with first-class honours in 1977. However he never practised law, finding it too confining.

Cricket career
Roebuck was a right-handed batsman, often used as an opener, and occasionally bowled right-arm offspin. He played for Somerset's second eleven at the age of 13 and regular first-class cricket from 1974 until his retirement in 1991. He later played Minor Counties cricket for Devon.

In 335 first-class matches he scored 17,558 runs at an average of 37.27, making 33 centuries with a highest score of 221*, and took 72 wickets at 49.16. In 298 one-day matches, he scored 7244 runs at 29.81 while taking 51 wickets at 25.09.

On the county circuit, Roebuck's nickname was Rupert. This arose when the Essex captain, Keith Fletcher, once addressed him as Rupert, in the mistaken belief that it was actually his name.

Roebuck was involved in Somerset's limited-over successes of the years 1979-83. In the Benson and Hedges Cup final of 1981 he helped Viv Richards in a partnership of 105 in Somerset's victory, and the following year, as Somerset successfully defended the title, helped the same player in an unbroken stand of the same amount, finishing as top-scorer.

In 1988 Roebuck was named as one of the Wisden Cricketers of the Year.

1986 controversy

Roebuck became a controversial figure in 1986 when, at the end of his first season as captain of Somerset, he was instrumental in the county's decision not to renew the contracts of its two overseas players, Viv Richards and Joel Garner, whose runs and wickets had brought the county much success in the previous eight years.

Roebuck and his supporters argued that both Richards and Garner were now ageing, that individually and collectively their contributions had declined dramatically and that younger overseas and home-grown players should be recruited to replace them. They cited the recent performance of the team in the County Championship – namely, last in 1985 and second last in 1986 – and their failure in one-day competitions since winning the NatWest Bank Trophy in 1983. A decision was precipitated by a fear that Martin Crowe of New Zealand, who had deputised as the county's overseas player in 1984 when Richards and Garner were with a West Indies touring party, might instead join Essex for 1987. 

Opposition to the decision not to re-employ Richards and Garner came loudest from Somerset's English-born star, the all-rounder Ian Botham, who refused a new contract for himself and joined Worcestershire. In the event, under Roebuck's captaincy and with Crowe and Steve Waugh of Australia as overseas players, Somerset improved a little in 1987, though they remained among the weaker counties for a further six seasons; Botham and Richards meanwhile went on to achieve a measure of success with new counties (respectively Worcestershire and Glamorgan). After many years of bitterness and the eventual removal of Roebuck from the club, Richards was honoured with the naming of a set of entrance gates and a stand after him at the County Ground, Taunton.

Later career
Roebuck was canvassed by some, including (according to Cricinfo) Ray Illingworth, as a possible successor to David Gower as England captain after England's heavy defeat in the Ashes in 1989, and led a representative England XI (including Derek Pringle, Rob Bailey, and future captains Nasser Hussain and Alec Stewart) in two limited-over matches against a Netherlands XI in 1989. However in the first such match "Roebuck had not realised that a 55-minute rain delay did not reduce the overs and England, unable to see in the darkness, lost by three runs". Although Roebuck led the side to comfortable victory in the second match the following day, Roebuck would never play a full international for England.

Post-cricket career

Commentator and journalist
His behind-the-scenes journal of Somerset's progress during the 1983 season, It Never Rains, first established him as a talented writer on the sport.

Having retired as a player and relocated to Australia, Roebuck wrote columns for The Sydney Morning Herald, The Age (Melbourne) and ESPNcricinfo, as well as commentating for the ABC radio cricket coverage in Australia. He became known for wearing his trademark straw sunhat at all times, even inside the commentary box.

He felt there was too much nationalism in Australian cricket writing and that it should be avoided at all costs when analysing the game. He was one of the few global voices in the game without allegiance to any nation, team or player.

A traditionalist at heart, he was one of the last journalists in cricket to acquire a laptop and mobile phone and expressed surprise and delight when he found them quite useful.

Roebuck was often critical of the successful Australian cricket team and, in particular, the Australian captain Ricky Ponting. Following Australia's narrow victory in the second Test against India at the Sydney Cricket Ground in 2007–08, Roebuck accused the Australians of "bad sportsmanship and triumphalism", describing the Australian team as a "pack of wild dogs" and writing that Ponting has "shown not the slightest interest in the well-being of the game, not the slightest sign of diplomatic skills, not a single mark of respect for his accomplished and widely admired opponents."

Roebuck was described as an astute judge of cricketers, a contrarian and a master wordsmith, and his writing was described as lean, erudite, fluent, perceptive and vibrant.

Philanthropy
In 2006, Roebuck established the Learning for a Better World Trust (LBW) to help students from cricket-playing developing countries to complete tertiary education. He resigned from the Trust in 2008. In addition to supporting the LBW Trust, Roebuck spent A$100,000 of his own money to help put African youths through high school and university. Psychology Maziwisa, a Zimbabwean lawyer Roebuck had mentored and whose education he had funded, wrote a tribute in which he stated that Roebuck had over 35 Zimbabweans in his care at the time of his death, and he had spent approximately $500,000 of his own money to "realise African dreams".

Personal life
Roebuck spent his last years residing in Straw Hat Farm, Pietermaritzburg, South Africa, as well as Bondi, Sydney, where he owned two houses. He grew increasingly estranged from England, but kept in regular touch with his mother and siblings. He became an Australian citizen. His colleague Malcolm Knox said of Roebuck that "nothing could rile him more, after he became an Australian citizen, than to be described as an Englishman of any kind, even a former one."

In 2005 Roebuck's father wrote that Peter is an "unconventional loner with an independent outlook on life, an irreverent sense of humour and sometimes a withering tongue."

Very much an introvert, he was a solitary person who preferred to read a book while eating alone rather than spend time in the company of his colleagues.

Assault conviction
In 1999, while working as a commentator in South Africa, Roebuck met three cricketers, all aged 19, and offered to coach them, inviting them to live at his home in England. He warned them beforehand that he would use corporal punishment if they failed to obey his "house rules". He caned all three men on their (clothed) buttocks at different times for misbehaviour and in 2001 was given a suspended jail sentence after pleading guilty to three charges of common assault. He told the court, "Obviously I misjudged the mood and that was my mistake and my responsibility and I accept that." Henk Lindeque, one of Roebuck's victims, stated that he held no ill will toward Roebuck and was saddened to hear of his death.

Death
Roebuck arrived in Cape Town, South Africa, on 7 November 2011 to report on a Test match between South Africa and Australia for The Sydney Morning Herald and the Australian Broadcasting Corporation (ABC). He was staying at the Southern Sun Hotel in Newlands, Cape Town, on 12 November, when the South African Police Service entered the hotel, claiming to desire to speak to him about an alleged sexual assault on a 26-year-old Zimbabwean man.

After requesting that he be allowed to go to his room to change his clothes, Roebuck called the ABC's Jim Maxwell in his hotel room and asked him to find him a lawyer and to then come to his hotel room.

At 9.15 pm, Roebuck died after jumping from the sixth floor of the Southern Sun Hotel. He landed on the awning outside the entrance to the hotel, causing what was described by Australian cricket writer Peter Lalor, who later saw Roebuck's body at the mortuary, as "serious head trauma". Roebuck's body was taken to the Salt River State mortuary in the early hours of the next morning. A statement issued by South African police stated that Roebuck had committed suicide and that an inquest into the matter would be held.

Students residing at Roebuck's farm in Natal, where he lived for six months of every year, stated that no corporal punishment was ever meted out at the residence.

In January 2012 Australian journalist Adam Shand published extensive research on Roebuck's dealings with the young men who lived with him in South Africa.

Legacy
Roebuck was Ed Cowan's mentor and former teacher at Cranbrook School. Cowan's maiden Test century came in the First Test between Australia and South Africa at the Gabba, Brisbane, on 12 November 2012, a year to the day after Roebuck's death.  Cowan dedicated the century to Roebuck's memory.

Biography
In mid-2014 a former colleague of Roebuck's at the Australian Broadcasting Corporation, Tim Lane, and writer Elliot Cartledge were commissioned to research his life story and investigate the circumstances of his death. Associates of Roebuck such as Vic Marks, Steve Waugh, Ian Chappell, Jonathan Agnew and Matthew Engel are quoted. The Zimbabwean man at the centre of the controversy that led to Roebuck's death, Itai Gondo, provided testimony. The book, Chasing Shadows – The Life and Death of Peter Roebuck, was released in the UK, Australia and New Zealand in late 2015.

Publications
 Slices of Cricket Unwin, (1982) , 
 It Never Rains: A Cricketer's Lot, Unwin, (1984) ; ;
 It Sort of Clicks (with Ian Botham), (1986) , 
 Great Innings, Blitz (1990) , 
 Tangled Up in White: Peter Roebuck On Cricket, Hodder & Stoughton, (1992) , 
 From Sammy to Jimmy: History of Somerset County Cricket Club, Partridge Press (1991) , 
 Sometimes I Forgot to Laugh (autobiography), Allen & Unwin (2004) 
 It Takes All Sorts: Celebrating Cricket's Colourful Characters, Allen & Unwin, (2005) 
 In It To Win It: The Australian Cricket Supremacy, Allen & Unwin, (2006)

References

1956 births
2011 suicides
English cricketers
English cricket commentators
English male journalists
English radio personalities
Cambridge University cricketers
Somerset cricket captains
Marylebone Cricket Club cricketers
Wisden Cricketers of the Year
Devon cricketers
Devon cricket captains
Cricket historians and writers
English emigrants to Australia
Naturalised citizens of Australia
Suicides by jumping in South Africa
Australian journalists
People educated at Millfield
English people convicted of assault
Alumni of Emmanuel College, Cambridge
English male non-fiction writers
Oxford and Cambridge Universities cricketers
British Universities cricketers
Young England cricketers